Expedition 12 (2005) was the 12th expedition to the International Space Station, launched from Kazakhstan using the Russian Soyuz TMA-7 spacecraft. The crew landed back in Kazakhstan on 8 April 2006 with the addition of the first Brazilian astronaut, Marcos Pontes.

American entrepreneur Gregory Olsen was launched in the Soyuz TMA-7 spacecraft and returned with Expedition 11 on Soyuz TMA-6 on 11 October 2005 thereby becoming the third space tourist.

Crew

Mission parameters
Perigee:
Apogee:
Inclination: 51.6 degrees
Orbital period:

Mission objectives
Station assembly preparations, maintenance and science in microgravity.

Spacewalks
There were two spacewalks outside the ISS during Expedition 12. MacArthur and Tokarev participated in both of them.

EVA 1 
The first EVA was on 7 November 2005 for 5 hours and 22 minutes. There were two main objectives, both of which were completed. The first was to install and set up a new camera on the P1 Truss which was later used in the installation of more truss segments. The second was to jettison the Floating Potential Probe which was a failed instrument, designed to measure the station's electrical potential and compare it to the surrounding plasma.

EVA 2
The second spacewalk took place on 3 February 2006 and lasted 5 hours and 43 minutes. The astronauts jettisoned an old Russian Orlan spacesuit, named SuitSat-1, that was equipped with a radio for broadcasts to students around the world. The suit reached the end of its operation life in 2004. They also retrieved the Biorisk experiment, photographed a sensor for a micrometeoroid experiment, and tied off the surviving umbilical of the mobile transporter.

Solar eclipse

 On 29 March 2006 a total solar eclipse took place, and the adjacent picture was taken by the Expedition 12 crew. It clearly shows the shadow of the Moon being cast on the Earth.

Concert
While wake-up music is a tradition aboard space shuttle missions, the ISS crew generally use an alarm clock to wake up.  Expedition 12 astronauts received a special treat on 3 November 2005 when Paul McCartney performed Good Day Sunshine and English Tea in a first ever concert linkup from the Arrowhead Pond in Anaheim, California on his US tour.  The event was broadcast live on NASA TV.

References

External links

 NASA: Expedition 12 Photography

Expedition 12
2005 in spaceflight
2006 in spaceflight